The ADM-144 was a missile project considered by the United States.

The ADM-144A designation was reserved for an unspecified missile project in 1989. No formal request for allocation of the designation followed, indicating that the project was cancelled in the very early stages.

References
 http://www.designation-systems.net/dusrm/m-144.html

See also

List of missiles

ADM-144